Oxynoemacheilus ercisianus is a species of stone loach endemic to Turkey.

References 
 

ercisianus
Endemic fauna of Turkey
Taxa named by Füsun Erk'akan
Taxa named by Mustafa Kuru
Fish described in 1992
Taxonomy articles created by Polbot